OGLE-2006-BLG-109L (where 'L' stands for lens) is a dim magnitude 17 M0V galactic bulge star approximately 4,920 light-years away in the constellation of Scorpius.

Planetary system 
In 2008, two extrasolar planets were discovered around the star using gravitational microlensing. The two planets are at a distance from their star that make them suspected analogs of Jupiter and Saturn. 
The star is surrounded by a planetary system consisting of at least two planets: b with a mass of 0.727 of Jupiter and c with the mass of approximately 0.271 of Jupiter. Their mass ratios, distance ratios, and equilibrium temperatures are similar to those of Jupiter and Saturn in the Solar System as well as the 47 UMa system.

Both planets were discovered simultaneously by gravitational microlensing in a common effort by the Optical Gravitational Lensing Experiment, microFUN, MOA, PLANET and RoboNet collaborations, as announced on 14 February 2008. This is the first planetary system where more than one planet was detected using gravitational microlensing.

See also 
 Optical Gravitational Lensing Experiment or OGLE
 OGLE-2005-BLG-390L

References

External links 
 
 
 
 
 
 

M-type main-sequence stars
Planetary systems with two confirmed planets
Scorpius (constellation)
Gravitational lensing